Symphyomethes is a genus of false soldier beetles in the family Omethidae, containing two described species.

Species
 Symphyomethes blandulus Wittmer, 1970
 Symphyomethes californicus Wittmer, 1970

References

Elateroidea